KFAN (1270 AM) is a radio station licensed to Rochester, Minnesota. The station owned by iHeartMedia, and rebroadcasts sister KFXN-FM in Minneapolis/St. Paul as part of the regional FAN Radio Network.

The station was, for many years, KWEB. In August 2011, Clear Channel parked the KTCN call sign on the frequency for several days, in anticipation of a format and station flip in the Twin Cities market. When KFAN (1130 AM) moved to 100.3 FM and adopted the KFXN-FM call sign, Clear Channel parked the KFAN call sign on 1270 AM in the Rochester market.

External links
mykfan.com

Radio stations in Minnesota
Sports radio stations in the United States
1957 establishments in Minnesota
IHeartMedia radio stations
Radio stations established in 1957